Alden S. Gooch, MD, (May 5, 1927 - August 20, 1987) was an American cardiologist and vice chairman of the Department of Cardiovascular Disease at Deborah Heart and Lung Center in Browns Mills, New Jersey. He was best known for his book, Clues to Diagnosis in Congenital Heart Disease. He was an authority on the systolic click murmur syndrome, tricuspid regurgitation, and arrhythmias in exercise stress testing.

Early life and education
Gooch was born in Bar Harbor, Hancock County, Maine, one of four children.

He served as a Lieutenant in the U.S. Navy in 1945, then he received his Bachelor of Arts degree from the University of Maine, in Orono, Maine in 1951.

He earned his medical degree in 1955 from the University of Rochester in Rochester, New York. He received his residency and fellowship training at George Washington University in Washington D.C. He later taught and conducted research as an assistant professor of cardiology. Ultimately, he practiced Cardiology, conducted research and taught as he expanded the Fellowship Program at the Deborah Heart and Lung Center.

Publications
Clues to Diagnosis in Congenital Heart Disease was published in 1969 by F.A Davis. The book's purpose was to "demonstrate the application of useful information in the diagnosis of congenital heart disease by illustrating various clues (or non-clues) to the diagnosis." Cases were "superbly demonstrated" with "striking display of graphic data." It (is) "a useful way of teaching of Congenital Heart Disease" and "present(ed) a challenge in diagnosis to the reader".

His research focused on cardiac mitral and tricuspid valve disease. His work was widely cited by other researchers. Specifically, he outlined the left ventricular abnormalities that were associated with mitral Valve Disease and its associated heart rhythm abnormalities. His research on tricuspid valve disease was highly influential.

Bibliography

Career and professional affiliations
At George Washington University, Gooch served as assistant professor of medicine and associate director of the Heart Station from 1966 to 1969. At Deborah Heart and Lung Center, he served as the vice chairman of the division of cardiology, director of the outpatient clinic, and director of the cardiology training program. He also served as the associate professor of medicine at the Robert Wood Johnson Medical School of Rutgers University and held the same position at Temple University School of Medicine. Throughout his career, in addition to his book, he edited three books and published over 75 scientific articles and 20 abstracts.

He was also was a visiting lecturer at Albert Einstein Medical Center and a representative of the New Jersey Council of Clinical Cardiology to the American Heart Association.

Gooch was a fellow at the following organizations:

 American Heart Association
 American College of Cardiology
 American College of Chest Diseases
 American College of Angiology
 American Federation of Clinical Research

Personal life
In 1947, he married Alice Hall of New Haven, Connecticut, and had five children. He died in 1987 in Medford, New Jersey. He was the brother of Brison Gooch.

References 

American cardiologists
1927 births
1987 deaths